Byram Dinshawji Avari (1942 – 22 January 2023) was a Pakistani businessman and twice Asian Games gold medalist. He was based in Karachi, Sindh and owner of Avari Hotels.

Early life
Byram Dinshawji Avari used to swim with his brother. They were trained in swimming by Chief Petty Officer (rtd.) Haji Allah-Ditta. Dinshaw and Xerxes along with the son of their coach, Zulfiqar Ali, were part of the Sindh swimming team. They trained at the Sports Complex Kashmir Road, Karachi, Pakistan.

Business concerns
Together with his sons, he owned and operated the Avari Group of companies, of which he was the chairman.

Hotel management is the Avari Group's core business. In Pakistan, the group owns and operates Avari Hotels which include 5-star deluxe hotels in Karachi Lahore,Sargodha,Gujranwala,Faisalabad and Now Avari Gilgat the 5-star Avari Towers and the seafront Beach Luxury Hotel in Karachi. The group is also actively pursuing opportunities for owning and/or managing 3 and 4-star properties elsewhere in Pakistan.

The Avari Group is the first Pakistani company to have obtained international hotel management contracts: they operate the 200-room 4-star hotel in Dubai in the United Arab Emirates and manage the 200-room Ramada Inn in Toronto at Pearson Airport in Canada.

Honorary Consul
Avari was the Honorary Consul, or a diplomatic representative, for Canada.

Sailing
Avari was the Commodore of Karachi Yacht Club in 1976 and again in 1980. He was a gold medallist in 'enterprise class' yachting at the 1978 Asian Games in Bangkok with Munir Sadiq and again at the 1982 Asian Games in New Delhi with his wife, Goshpi. He also won a silver medal at the Enterprise World Championship held in Canada in 1978.

Parsi Community
Avari was Chairman of the Karachi Parsi Anjuman.

Personal life and death
Avari was married to Gosphi and had two sons and a daughter. 

Avari died on 22 January 2023, at the age of 81.

Awards and recognition
Pride of Performance Award for Sports (Sailing) in 1982 by the President of Pakistan

See also 
 Avari Hotels
 List of Parsis

References

1942 births
2023 deaths
Businesspeople from Karachi
Parsi people
Pakistani industrialists
Pakistani Zoroastrians
Pakistani hoteliers
Pakistani socialites
Pakistani male sailors (sport)
Asian Games gold medalists for Pakistan
Recipients of the Pride of Performance
Sportspeople from Karachi
Asian Games medalists in sailing
Sailors at the 1978 Asian Games
Sailors at the 1982 Asian Games
Medalists at the 1978 Asian Games
Medalists at the 1982 Asian Games